St. Rita High School was a coeducational Catholic high school in Detroit, Michigan, United States. The school was operated by the Sisters of St. Joseph. It closed in 1972

References

Defunct Catholic secondary schools in Michigan
High schools in Detroit